Edward Conroy may refer to:
Edward T. Conroy, attorney and state senator in Maryland
Ed Conroy (basketball) (Edward S. Conroy), American college basketball coach
Edward Conroy, city manager of Medford, Massachusetts
Sir Edward Conroy, 2nd Baronet (1809–1869), of the Conroy baronets

See also
Ed Conroy (disambiguation)
Conroy (disambiguation)